In literary theory, a text is any object that can be "read", whether this object is a work of literature, a street sign, an arrangement of buildings on a city block, or styles of clothing.  It is a coherent set of  signs that transmits some kind of informative message. This set of signs is considered in terms of the informative message's content, rather than in terms of its physical form or the medium in which it is represented. 
 
Within the field of literary criticism, "text" also refers to the original information content of a particular piece of writing; that is, the "text" of a work is that primal symbolic arrangement of letters as originally composed, apart from later alterations, deterioration, commentary, translations, paratext, etc.  Therefore, when literary criticism is concerned with the determination of a "text", it is concerned with the distinguishing of the original information content from whatever has been added to or subtracted from that content as it appears in a given textual document (that is, a physical representation of text).

Since the history of writing predates the concept of the "text", most texts were not written with this concept in mind. Most written works fall within a narrow range of the types described by text theory. The concept of "text" becomes relevant if and when a "coherent written message is completed and needs to be referred to independently of the circumstances in which it was created."

Etymology
The word text has its origins in Quintilian's Institutio Oratoria, with the statement that "after you have chosen your words, they must be weaved together into a fine and delicate fabric", with the Latin for fabric being textum.

Uses of the term for analysis of work practice
Relying on literary theory, the notion of text has been used to analyse contemporary work practices. For example, Christensen (2016) rely on the concept of text for the analysis of work practice at a hospital.

See also 
Text linguistics
Textual criticism
Textual scholarship
Theme (narrative)

References

Further reading

 Barry, Peter. Beginning Theory: an Introduction to Literary and Cultural Theory, 4th edn. Manchester: Manchester University Press, 2017. .
Bakhtin, M. M. (1981) The Dialogic Imagination: Four Essays. Ed. Michael Holquist. Trans. Caryl Emerson and Michael Holquist. Austin and London: University of Texas Press.
 Culler, Jonathan; (1997) Literary Theory: a Very Short Introduction. Oxford: Oxford University Press. .
 Eagleton, Terry. Literary Theory: an Introduction, 2nd edn. Hoboken: John Wiley & Sons, 2011. .
 Eagleton, Terry. After Theory. NY: Basic Books, 2003. .
 Groden, Michael, Martin Kreiswirth, & Imre Szeman, eds. The Johns Hopkins Guide to Literary Theory and Criticism, 2nd edn. Baltimore: Johns Hopkins University Press, 2005. .
 Lodge, David and Nigel Wood, eds. Modern Criticism and Theory: a Reader, 3rd edn. Harlow: Pearson Longman, 2008.
 Patai, Daphne and Wilfrido H. Corral, eds. Theory's Empire: an Anthology of Dissent. NY: Columbia University Press, 2005. .
 Rabaté, Jean-Michel. The Future of Theory. Oxford: Blackwell, 2002. .

Literary theory